Andries Christiaan Niemann (12 August 1927 – 13 August 2009) was a South African boxer, bronze medalist at the 1952 Summer Olympics in Helsinki.

References

External links

Olympic boxers of South Africa
Olympic bronze medalists for South Africa
Boxers at the 1952 Summer Olympics
Olympic medalists in boxing
Medalists at the 1952 Summer Olympics
South African male boxers
Afrikaner people
1927 births
2009 deaths
Heavyweight boxers